Christopher Eubanks and Roberto Quiroz were the defending champions but chose not to defend their title.

Jesper de Jong and Sem Verbeek won the title after defeating Konstantin Kravchuk and Denis Yevseyev 6–1, 3–6, [10–5] in the final.

Seeds

Draw

References

External links
 Main draw

Saint Petersburg Challenger II - Doubles